The Nærøysund Bridge is a suspension bridge that crosses the Nærøysundet strait between the islands of Marøya and Nærøysund in Trøndelag county, Norway. Together with the Marøysund Bridge, it connects the islands of Vikna to the mainland. The bridge has 17 spans. The Nærøysund Bridge was opened in 1981, when it briefly held the title of the world's longest cable-stay bridge.

References

External links
Picture of the bridge
Another picture of the bridge

Road bridges in Trøndelag
Bridges completed in 1981
Suspension bridges in Norway
1981 establishments in Norway
Nærøy
Nærøysund
Vikna